Clivina choatei is a species of ground beetle in the subfamily Scaritinae. It was described by Bousquet & Skelley in 2012.

References

choatei
Beetles described in 2012